The groove for transverse sinus is a groove which runs along the internal surface of the occipital bone, running laterally between the superior and inferior fossae of the cruciform eminence. The transverse sinuses travel along this groove.

A small or absent bony groove in the occiput in conjunction with the compressible nature of the transverse sinus makes this structure vulnerable to tapering with increased ICP.

Additional images

See also 
 Internal occipital protuberance
 Occipital bone
 Transverse sinus

References

External links 

 

Bones of the head and neck

hu:Protuberantia occipitalis interna
th:ปุ่มในของท้ายทอย